The Xiali N7 is a subcompact crossover SUV produced by the Chinese automotive manufacturer FAW Group under the Xiali brand.

Overview

The N7 reveal was presented at the Shanghai Auto Show 2011 as the FAW R008 concept vehicle. In March 2013, the N7 was launched exclusively for the Chinese market. Production of the N7 ended at the end of 2019.

Specifications
The five-seater is powered by a  1.3-liter gasoline engine with four cylinders, which is also used in the Xiali N5. The vehicle has a 5-speed manual transmission as standard, a 4-speed automatic transmission is available for an additional charge.

References 

FAW Group vehicles
Cars introduced in 2013
Cars discontinued in 2019
Front-wheel-drive vehicles
Mini sport utility vehicles
Crossover sport utility vehicles